Ciardi is an Italian surname. Notable people with the surname include:

Benedetta Ciardi (born 1971), Italian astrophysicist
Beppe Ciardi (1875–1932), Italian painter
Cesare Ciardi (1818–1877), Italian flautist and composer
David Ciardi (born 1969), American astrophysicist 
Emma Ciardi (1879–1933), Italian painter
Fabio Cifariello Ciardi (born 1960), Italian composer
Francesca Ciardi (born 1954), Italian actress
Guglielmo Ciardi (1842–1917), Italian painter
John Ciardi (1916–1986), American poet, translator, and etymologist
Mark Ciardi (born 1961), American film producer and baseball player

Italian-language surnames